This is a list of fossiliferous stratigraphic units in Lesotho.



See also 
 Lists of fossiliferous stratigraphic units in Africa
 List of fossiliferous stratigraphic units in South Africa
 Geology of Lesotho

References

Further reading 
 F. Knoll. 2010. A primitive sauropodomorph from the upper Elliot Formation of Lesotho. Geological Magazine 147(6):814-829
 P. Ellenberger. 1970. Paleontological levels of first appearance of primorid mammals in South Africa and their ichnology. Establishment of detailed stratigraphic zones in the Lesotho Stormberg (South Africa) (Upper to Jurassic Triassic) [The paleontological levels of the primordial appearance of primordial mammals in southern Africa and their ichnology. Establishment of detailed stratigraphic zones in the Stormberg of Lesotho (southern Africa) (Upper Triassic to Jurassic). In: SH Haughton (ed.), Second Symposium on Gondwana Stratigraphy and Paleontology, International Union of Geological Sciences. Council for Scientific and Industrial Research, Pretoria 343-370
 F. Ellenberger, P. Ellenberger, J. Fabre and C. Mendrez. 1963. Deux nouvelles dalles à pistes de Vertébrés fossiles découvertes au Basutoland (Afrique du Sud) [Two new sites of fossil vertebrate prints discovered in Basutoland (South Africa)]. Comptes Rendus de la Société géologique de France 1963:315-317

Lesotho
 
 
Fossiliferous stratigraphic units
Fossil